J. E. Greiner Company was a Baltimore, Maryland-based civil engineering firm specializing in bridge design.

History

The firm was founded in 1908 by former Baltimore and Ohio Railroad bridge engineer John Edwin Greiner (February 24, 1859 – November 15, 1942) and led by Greiner and his associate Hershel Heathcote Allen. The firm was later known as Greiner Engineering and opened a second office in Chicago, apparently in connection with its work on the Calumet (Chicago) Skyway. In 1995, the firm was acquired by URS Corporation, now part of AECOM.

The firm designed numerous notable bridges and also prepared transportation planning studies, the first of which was Maryland's Primary Bridge Program for the Maryland State Roads Commission (1938). Later studies included Transportation Plans for Washington (D.C., 1946) and Expressway System for Metropolitan Providence (Rhode Island, 1947), both with De Leuw, Cather & Company.

Works
Baltimore Harbor Tunnel - under Patapsco River and Helen Delich Bentley Port of Baltimore
Baltimore–Washington Parkway - formerly Interstate 295, later Maryland Route 295
Bellaire Bridge
Bridge of Lions (St. Augustine, Florida)
Calumet (Chicago) Skyway, (Chicago, Illinois)
Chesapeake Bay Bridge - 
Governor Harry W. Nice Memorial Bridge - over lower Potomac River between Maryland and Virginia, below Washington, D.C.
Hanover Street Bridge (Baltimore, Maryland) - (Later renamed "Vietnam Veterans Memorial Bridge" in 2000s - built 1914-1917 carrying South Hanover Street Maryland Route 2 over Ferry Branch / Middle Branch of the Patapsco River / Baltimore Harbor)
Howard Street Bridge (Baltimore, Maryland)
Interstate 70 in Maryland
Martin Luther King Jr. Memorial Bridge (Petersburg, Virginia)
Silver Bridge (Point Pleasant, West Virginia, and Gallipolis, Ohio)
Thomas J. Hatem Memorial Bridge - over Susquehanna River in northeastern Maryland
Whitney Young Memorial Bridge (East Capitol Street Bridge, Washington, D.C.)
Fred Hartman Memorial Bridge (Houston, Texas)

References

External links
J. E. Greiner Company at bridgehunter.com
J. E. Greiner Company at Philadelphia Architects and Buildings
John Edwin Greiner at Philadelphia Architects and Buildings
J. E. Greiner Company at Structurae

1908 establishments in Maryland
1995 disestablishments in Maryland
American bridge engineers
Defunct companies based in Baltimore